Viktor Bonev Radev (Bulgarian: Виктор Бонев Радев) (November 19, 1936 – August 31, 2014) was a Bulgarian basketball player. He was born in Maritsa Municipality, Bulgaria. He was a 1.96 m (6'5") tall forward.

Club career
Radev reached two consecutive EuroLeague Finals with Akademik Sofia, in 1958 and 1959.

Bulgarian national team
As a member of the senior men's Bulgarian national team, he won the silver medal at the EuroBasket 1957 and the bronze medal at the EuroBasket 1961. He also competed in the men's tournament at the 1956 Summer Olympics and 1960 Summer Olympics.

References

External links
Fibaeurope.com Profile
Viktor Radev's obituary 

1936 births
2014 deaths
Basketball players at the 1956 Summer Olympics
Basketball players at the 1960 Summer Olympics
Bulgarian men's basketball players
1959 FIBA World Championship players
Olympic basketball players of Bulgaria
PBC Academic players
Forwards (basketball)